Vlatko Vuković Kosača (died ) was a 14th-century Bosnian nobleman who held the titles of the Duke of Hum and Grand Duke of Bosnia. He distinguished himself as one of the best military commanders of King Tvrtko I in battles against the Ottoman Empire.

Biography
Vlatko was probably a son of duke Vuk Kosača, often regarded as founder of the Kosača noble family. He governed Hum (part of modern-day Herzegovina), which was part of the Banate of Bosnia and later Kingdom of Bosnia.

The Ottoman threat was building to the east, threatening Bosnia and its southeastern regions in Hum. On 27 August 1388, Grand Duke Vlatko defeated an Ottoman raiding party (probably up to 18,000 strong) in the Battle of Bileća. Bosnian heavy cavalry is typically credited with winning the battle as they broke the Ottoman ranks and pursued the retreating enemy. Celebrated Ottoman commander Lala Sahin Pasha (1330 – cca 1382) barely managed to save himself with the small band of his soldiers.

In 1389, dispatched by his king Tvrtko I, he commanded a Bosnian army contingent as part of a Christian coalition that fought alongside Serbian prince Lazar Hrebeljanović at the Battle of Kosovo against the Ottomans. Vuković was one of few commanders who survived the battle. Although the battle is viewed now as tactically inconclusive, at the time the battle was viewed differently - Vuković reported the outcome of the battle as a victory, as the Ottomans suffered heavy losses and were forced to withdraw for a time.

In 1391–1392, council was convoked by the king or noblemen who opposed the sale of Konavli by Radič Sanković to Dubrovnik, and Vuković and Pavle Radenović later captured Konavli and divided it between themselves.

He died sometime between August 1392 - August 1393. His nephew Sandalj Hranić succeeded him. It was thought that both Vlatko's and his wife's graves lie marked in stećak necropolis near the village of Boljuni, not far from Stolac, in Bosnia and Herzegovina. Written in older Serbian Cyrillic, inscription on that particular grave says: "Асе лежи добри јунак и човјек Влатко Вуковић", however, neither grave belong to a famous duke and/or his wife.

References

Sources

External links 
 Historijsko područje- nekropola stećaka I i II Boljuni - Komisija za očuvanje nacionalnih spomenika BiH
 Vlatko Vuković's grave location in Panoramio
 Šefik Bešlagić, Stećci - kataloško-topografski pregled

Bosnian magnates
Grand Dukes of Bosnia
Kingdom of Bosnia
Kosača noble family
14th-century Bosnian people
Year of birth missing
1392 deaths
Vuković noble family